This list is of Japanese structures dating from the Heian period (794–1185) that have been designated Important Cultural Properties (including *National Treasures).

Structures

Early Heian period
Seven surviving sites with the same number of component structures have been designated, including four National Treasures. Despite the transfer of the capital to Heian-kyō, due to losses in fires and wars, all are in Nara Prefecture, other than for a stone tō in Gunma Prefecture. Those at Tōdai-ji form part of the UNESCO World Heritage Site Historic Monuments of Ancient Nara; that at Hōryū-ji is part of the World Heritage Site Buddhist Monuments in the Hōryū-ji Area.

Middle Heian period
Five surviving sites with eight component structures have been designated, all but one of them National Treasures. The Phoenix Hall at Byōdō-in is designated as a single site with four component structures. The five-storey pagoda at Daigo-ji is the earliest structure within the current borders of the city of Kyoto. Both form part of the World Heritage Site Historic Monuments of Ancient Kyoto (Kyoto, Uji and Otsu Cities).

Late Heian period
Thirty-five surviving sites with thirty-six component structures have been designated, including fourteen National Treasures. The earliest structures, other than four stone tō, outside Nara and Kyoto Prefectures date from the second half of the eleventh century or early twelfth century. Those at Chūson-ji form part of the World Heritage Site Hiraizumi – Temples, Gardens and Archaeological Sites Representing the Buddhist Pure Land. Buraku-ji in Kōchi Prefecture, Shikoku, and Fuki-ji in Ōita Prefecture, Kyushu, contain the earliest wooden structures outside Honshu. The honden of Ujigami Jinja is the earliest wooden Shinto shrine building, while two stone examples from the city of Yamagata are the earliest torii.

See also

 Cultural Properties of Japan
 Japanese Buddhist architecture
 List of Important Cultural Properties of Japan (Nara period: structures)
 List of Important Cultural Properties of Japan (Kamakura period: structures)

References

Heian period
Important Cultural Properties of Japan
Architecture in Japan